James Ogilvy or Ogilvie may also refer to:

James Ogilvy, member of the British royal family
James Ogilvy, 5th Lord Ogilvy of Airlie (died 1606), Scottish landowner and diplomat
James Ogilvy, 1st Earl of Airlie (1593–1666), Scottish royalist
James Ogilvy, 4th Earl of Findlater (1664–1730), Scottish politician
James Ogilvy, 6th Earl of Findlater (c. 1714–1770), Scottish earl
James Ogilvy, 7th Earl of Findlater (1750–1811), Scottish peer, amateur landscape architect and philanthropist
James Ogilvy-Grant, 9th Earl of Seafield (1817–1888), Scottish peer and member of parliament
James Ogilvie (bishop) (died 1518), Scottish prelate
James Nicoll Ogilvie (1860–1926), Scottish minister
James Albert Ogilvie "Odie" Cleghorn (1891–1956), Canadian ice hockey player, coach, linesman and referee
James Ogilvie (coach) (died 1950), American football player and coach
James Ogilvie-Grant, 11th Earl of Seafield (1876–1915), Scottish nobleman